Gordon McLeod (born 2 September 1967 in Edinburgh) is a Scottish former footballer who played as a midfielder.

Career
McLeod came through the youth ranks at Dundee United but managed only 27 appearances in a five-year spell. In 1988, McLeod moved to Airdrieonians, managing just nine league appearances before moving back to Tayside with United's rivals, Dundee. McLeod was a regular during his time at Dens Park, playing in nearly 70 league matches during his two years there before moving back to his hometown Edinburgh in 1992 with Meadowbank Thistle. McLeod stayed with Meadowbank through their restructuring as Livingston in 1995 and remained with the club until 1998, where he moved to Bonnyrigg Rose.  As a youth, McLeod was a runner-up in the Under-18 European Championship with Scotland in 1986.

McLeod is now a sales rep for a wholesaler in Edinburgh. He has 2 children. He is famed for his Poodle related Facebook messages, posted on Fridays, celebrating the upcoming weekend.

Honours
 Under-18 European Championship runner-up: 1
 1986
 Scottish Third Division: 1
 1995–96

References

External links
 

1967 births
Living people
Footballers from Edinburgh
Scottish footballers
Dundee United F.C. players
Airdrieonians F.C. (1878) players
Dundee F.C. players
Livingston F.C. players
Scottish Football League players
Bonnyrigg Rose Athletic F.C. players
Scotland youth international footballers
Association football midfielders